Judith Reid (born 1954 or 1955) is a politician in British Columbia, Canada. She is a former Liberal Party Member of the Legislative Assembly (MLA), and was Minister of Transportation for 3 years.

First elected in a 1998 by-election for Parksville-Qualicum, Reid was re-elected in the 2001 general election as MLA for Nanaimo-Parksville. From June 2001 to January 2004, she served as BC's Minister of Transportation. Her term was marked by the controversial 2003 lease of BC Rail assets and right-of-way to Canadian National Railway.

Reid did not run for re-election in 2005.

An entrepreneur, Reid has worked on several business ventures, including development of a shellfish farm on Vancouver Island. She served on the executive of the BC Shellfish Growers Association.

Reid has four sons and four grandchildren. She home-schooled her children for some of their school years.

References

External links
 Official government bio

British Columbia Liberal Party MLAs
Women government ministers of Canada
Members of the Executive Council of British Columbia
Women MLAs in British Columbia
Living people
21st-century Canadian politicians
Year of birth uncertain
21st-century Canadian women politicians
Year of birth missing (living people)